Ross Ewington (born 1947) was an alpine skier from New Zealand.

In the 1972 Winter Olympics at Sapporo, he came 49th in the Downhill, but was disqualified in the Slalom and did not finish in the Giant Slalom.

References 
 Black Gold by Ron Palenski (2008, 2004 New Zealand Sports Hall of Fame, Dunedin) p. 104

External links 
 
 

Living people
1947 births
New Zealand male alpine skiers
Olympic alpine skiers of New Zealand
Alpine skiers at the 1972 Winter Olympics